Carex congdonii is a tussock-forming species of perennial sedge in the family Cyperaceae. It is native to parts of California.

The sedge has a turf-like habit with short rhizomes forming many stems. It has leaves with a reddish colour that are purple tinged basal sheaths.

See also
List of Carex species

References

congdonii
Taxa named by Liberty Hyde Bailey
Plants described in 1896
Flora of California